Josh Johnson is a stand-up comedian, musician, and comedy writer known for touring with Trevor Noah on the LOUD & CLEAR tour.

Johnson was named New York's Funniest Stand Up at the New York Comedy Festival in 2018. He has written for The Daily Show with Trevor Noah since 2017. Prior to that he was a writer and performer on The Tonight Show Starring Jimmy Fallon which was where he made his late-night debut. His comedic story "Catfishing the KKK" has been viewed over 12 million times on YouTube.

Johnson's first half-hour special was on Comedy Central in 2017. His first hour-long special #(HASHTAG) premiered on Paramount+ and was named one of the best comedy specials of 2021 by Vulture Magazine. In 2021 Johnson took bits from his stand-up and interspersed "deepy sincere music" in a 33-track mixtape album called Elusive which he worked on with Mike Relm.

In 2018, he appeared on the Netflix stand-up comedy series, "The Comedy Lineup".

Johnson is from Alexandria, Louisiana. He received a degree in lighting design for theater from Centenary College in 2012. He lived in Chicago before moving to New York City.

References

External links
 Official website

Living people
Year of birth unknown
African-American male comedians
American male comedians
American comedy writers
American stand-up comedians
People from Alexandria, Louisiana
American television writers
21st-century American comedians
21st-century African-American people
1990 births